Bringhi may refer to:
Bringhi River, a river in Jammu and Kashmir, India
Bringhi (ship), an Egyptian ship sunk in 1942 in World War II
Bringhe, a rice dish from the Philippines